Attaleinae is a subtribe of plants in the family Arecaceae. Genera in the subtribe, the majority of which are found in South America, are:

Beccariophoenix – Madagascar
Jubaeopsis – South Africa; monotypic genus
Voanioala – NE Madagascar; monotypic genus; monotypic genus
Allagoptera – Central South America
Attalea – Americas
Butia – SE South America
Cocos – cosmopolitan; monotypic genus
Jubaea – Chile; monotypic genus
Syagrus – South America
Parajubaea – Andes

See also 
 List of Arecaceae genera

References

External links 

 
Arecaceae subtribes